Stygnomma is a genus of armoured harvestmen in the family Stygnommatidae. There are more than 30 described species in Stygnomma.

Species
These 31 species belong to the genus Stygnomma:

 Stygnomma annulipes (Goodnight & Goodnight, 1947)
 Stygnomma batatalense González-Sponga, 2005
 Stygnomma belizense Goodnight & Goodnight, 1977
 Stygnomma bispinatum Goodnight & Goodnight, 1953
 Stygnomma cubiroense González-Sponga, 2005
 Stygnomma delicatulum Rambla, 1976
 Stygnomma fiskei Rambla, 1969
 Stygnomma fuentesi González-Sponga, 2005
 Stygnomma fuhrmanni Roewer, 1912
 Stygnomma furvum González-Sponga, 1987
 Stygnomma gracilitibiae González-Sponga, 1987
 Stygnomma granulosa (Goodnight & Goodnight, 1977)
 Stygnomma jajoense González-Sponga, 2005
 Stygnomma joannae Rambla, 1976
 Stygnomma larense González-Sponga, 1987
 Stygnomma leleupi Rambla, 1976
 Stygnomma macrochelae González-Sponga, 2005
 Stygnomma monagasiense Soares & Avram, 1981
 Stygnomma ornatum González-Sponga, 1987
 Stygnomma pecki Goodnight & Goodnight, 1977
 Stygnomma planum Goodnight & Goodnight, 1953
 Stygnomma purpureum González-Sponga, 1987
 Stygnomma salmeronense González-Sponga, 2005
 Stygnomma solisitiens González-Sponga, 1987
 Stygnomma spiniferum (Packard, 1888)
 Stygnomma spinipalpis Goodnight & Goodnight, 1953
 Stygnomma spinula (Goodnight & Goodnight, 1942)
 Stygnomma teapense Goodnight & Goodnight, 1951
 Stygnomma toledense Goodnight & Goodnight, 1977
 Stygnomma truxillense González-Sponga, 1987
 Stygnomma tuberculatum Goodnight & Goodnight, 1973

References

Further reading

 
 
 

Harvestmen
Articles created by Qbugbot